Zadneye is a rural locality (a village) in Vorobyovskoye Rural Settlement, Sokolsky District, Vologda Oblast, Russia. The population was 11 as of 2002.

Geography 
Zadneye is located 76 km northeast of Sokol (the district's administrative centre) by road. Seredneye is the nearest rural locality.

References 

Rural localities in Sokolsky District, Vologda Oblast